RC9 may refer to:

Engineering fit#RC8 and RC9: Loose Running Fits
Route Coloniale 9
A MMPI scale